A tactic is a conceptual action or short series of actions with the aim of achieving a short-term goal. This action can be implemented as one or more specific tasks. The term is commonly used in business, protest and military contexts, as well as in chess, sports or other competitive activities. The word originated from the Ancient Greek  taktike, meaning art of arrangement.

Distinction from strategy
A strategy is a set of guidelines used to achieve an overall objective, whereas tactics are the specific actions aimed at adhering to those guidelines.

Military usage
In military usage, a military tactic is used by a military unit of no larger than a division to implement a specific mission and achieve a specific objective, or to advance toward a specific target.

The terms tactic and strategy are often confused: tactics are the actual means used to gain an objective, while strategy is the overall campaign plan, which may involve complex operational patterns, activity, and decision-making that govern tactical execution. The United States Department of Defense Dictionary of Military Terms defines the tactical level as "the level of war at which battles and engagements are planned and executed to accomplish military objectives assigned to tactical units or task forces. Activities at this level focus on the ordered arrangement and maneuver of combat elements in relation to each other and to the enemy to achieve combat objectives."

If, for example, the overall goal is to win a war against another country, one strategy might be to undermine the other nation's ability to wage war by preemptively annihilating their military forces. The tactics involved might describe specific actions taken in specific locations, like surprise attacks on military facilities, missile attacks on offensive weapon stockpiles, and the specific techniques involved in accomplishing such objectives.

See also
Chess tactics
Political tactics
Protest tactics
Tactical bombing
Tactical wargame

References

External links

 Tactics - BusinessDictionary.com definition